Hidekazu (written: 秀和, 英和, 秀一 or 英一) is a masculine Japanese given name. Notable people with the name include:

, Japanese rower
, Japanese manga artist
, Japanese voice actor
, Japanese comedian
, Japanese composer and arranger
, Japanese sport wrestler
, Japanese music critic and literary critic

Japanese masculine given names